Jane D'Arista is an American economist and research associate at the Economic Policy Institute and co-coordinator of its Committee of Economists and Analysts for Financial Reform. She has written on the history of U.S. monetary policy and financial regulation, international and domestic monetary systems, and capital flows to emerging economies. She served for 20 years as a staff economist for the U.S. Congress, and then, from 1988 to 1999, she taught international finance at Boston University School of Law. She authored The Evolution of U.S. Finance (2009).

Early life and education 
D'Arista studied at Barnard College.

References

Bibliography

External links
 
 

Living people
21st-century American economists
American women economists
Boston University faculty
Year of birth missing (living people)
21st-century American women
Barnard College alumni